John Makdessi (born May 3, 1985) is a Canadian professional mixed martial artist currently competing in the Lightweight division of the Ultimate Fighting Championship.

Background
Makdessi was born in Halifax, Nova Scotia, Canada on May 3, 1985, and is a first-generation Lebanese-Canadian born to Lebanese parents. His martial arts training started with Tae Kwon Do at the age of six. When Makdessi started high school, his dojo closed, and he could no longer continue. Towards the end of high school at the age of 19, he found a karate dojo where he learned Shotokan. Makdessi spent a lot of his time competing in kickboxing tournaments, and in 2006 won a gold medal in the USKBA. After going 22–0 in kickboxing, Makdessi began training in mixed martial arts.

Mixed martial arts career

Early career
Makdessi made his professional MMA debut in 2008 and compiled an undefeated record of 7-0 before being signed by the UFC.

Ultimate Fighting Championship
Makdessi signed with the UFC in 2010. He made his promotional debut on December 11, 2010, at UFC 124 in Montreal, winning a dominant (30-27, 30–27, 30–26) decision over Pat Audinwood.

Makdessi was expected to face TUF 12 winner Jonathan Brookins on April 30, 2011, at UFC 129.  Brookins pulled out of the bout and was replaced by another TUF 12 alum in Kyle Watson, who Makdessi knocked out with a spinning backfist in the third round.

Makdessi was expected to face Paul Taylor on August 14, 2011, at UFC on Versus 5, but withdrew due to injury.

Makdessi suffered the first loss of his career to Dennis Hallman on December 10, 2011, at UFC 140, via first-round rear naked choke.

Makdessi lost a unanimous decision to fellow striker Anthony Njokuani on April 21, 2012, at UFC 145.

Makdessi next defeated Sam Stout by unanimous decision on November 17, 2012, at UFC 154.

Makdessi then fought Daron Cruickshank at UFC 158 on March 16, 2013. He won the fight via unanimous decision.

Makdessi was expected to face Edson Barboza on July 6, 2013, at UFC 162.  Makdessi pulled out of the bout citing an injury and was replaced by Rafaello Oliveira.

Makdessi knocked out Renée Forte in the first round on September 21, 2013, at UFC 165.

Makdessi lost a unanimous decision to Alan Patrick at UFC 169 on February 1, 2014.

Makdessi was expected to face Abel Trujillo on April 25, 2015, at UFC 186. Trujillo pulled out of the fight citing an injury, and was replaced on April 1 by promotional newcomer Shane Campbell. Makdessi won the fight via TKO in the first round.

Less than a month after his win, Makdessi returned to the octagon as a replacement for injured Khabib Nurmagomedov against Donald Cerrone on May 23, 2015, at UFC 187. Makdessi lost the fight via TKO after his jaw was broken with a head kick in the second round.

Makdessi faced Yancy Medeiros on December 12, 2015, at UFC 194. He lost the fight by split decision.

Makdessi next faced Mehdi Baghdad on July 7, 2016, at UFC Fight Night 90. He was awarded a split decision victory.

Makdessi faced Lando Vannata on December 10, 2016, at UFC 206. He lost the fight via knockout in the first round.

Makdessi was expected to face Sage Northcutt on July 29, 2017, at UFC 214. In turn, the fight was canceled on July 14 as both fighters cited injuries.

Makdessi faced Abel Trujillo on December 16, 2017, at UFC on Fox 26. He won the fight by unanimous decision.

Makdessi faced Ross Pearson on July 28, 2018, at UFC on Fox 30. He won the fight by unanimous decision. This fight earned him the Fight of the Night award.

Makdessi was expected to face Carlos Diego Ferreira on December 8, 2018, at UFC 231. However, on November 28, 2018, it was reported that Makdessi was removed from the card and replaced by Jesse Ronson.

Makdessi was expected to face Nasrat Haqparast on March 23, 2019, at UFC Fight Night 148.  However, on March 13, 2019, it was reported that Haqparast was pulled from the bout due to injury and was replaced by Jesus Pinedo. Makdessi won the fight via unanimous decision.

Makdessi was scheduled to face Devonte Smith on August 17, 2019, at UFC 241.  However, it was reported on 30 July 2019 that Makdessi was forced to withdraw for undisclosed reason.

Makdessi faced Francisco Trinaldo on March 14, 2020, at UFC Fight Night 170. He lost the fight via unanimous decision.

Makdessi faced Ignacio Bahamondes on April 10, 2021, at UFC on ABC 2. At the weigh-ins, Ignacio Bahamondes weighed in at 156.75 pounds, 0.75 pound over the lightweight non-title fight limit. The bout proceeded at a catchweight and Bahamondes was fined 20% of his individual purse, which went to Makdessi. Makdessi won the bout via split decision.

Makdessi faced Nasrat Haqparast on September 3, 2022, at UFC Fight Night 209. He lost the fight via unanimous decision.

Championships and accomplishments

Mixed martial arts
Ultimate Fighting Championship
Fight of the Night (One time) vs. Ross Pearson

Fear the Fighter sponsorship controversy
Makdessi is listed as the president of the MMA apparel brand Fear the Fighter, which has sponsored several MMA and UFC fighters. Since 2014, a number of fighters have come forward with complaints, alleging that Fear the Fighter had failed to pay their respective sponsorship fees. Akira Corassani, Tim Elliott, John Dodson, Georgi Karakhanyan, and Gegard Mousasi have publicly made such allegations. In April 2015, Mousasi's management team stated that they had filed a lawsuit against Makdessi and Fear the Fighter due to their alleged failure to pay the outstanding debt owed to Mousasi.

Mixed martial arts record

|Loss
|align=center|18–8
|Nasrat Haqparast
|Decision (unanimous)
|UFC Fight Night: Gane vs. Tuivasa
|
|align=center|3
|align=center|5:00
|Paris, France
|-->
|-
|Win
|align=center|18–7
|Ignacio Bahamondes
|Decision (split)
|UFC on ABC: Vettori vs. Holland
|
|align=center|3
|align=center|5:00
|Las Vegas, Nevada, United States
|
|-
|Loss
|align=center|17–7
|Francisco Trinaldo
|Decision (unanimous)
|UFC Fight Night: Lee vs. Oliveira 
|
|align=center|3
|align=center|5:00
|Brasília, Brazil
|
|-
|Win
|align=center|17–6
|Jesus Pinedo
|Decision (unanimous)
|UFC Fight Night: Thompson vs. Pettis 
|
|align=center|3
|align=center|5:00
|Nashville, Tennessee, United States
|
|-
|Win
|align=center|16–6
|Ross Pearson
|Decision (unanimous)
|UFC on Fox: Alvarez vs. Poirier 2 
|
|align=center|3
|align=center|5:00
|Calgary, Alberta, Canada
|
|- 
|Win
|align=center|15–6
|Abel Trujillo
|Decision (unanimous)
|UFC on Fox: Lawler vs. dos Anjos 
|
|align=center|3
|align=center|5:00
|Winnipeg, Manitoba, Canada
|
|-
|Loss
|align=center|14–6
|Lando Vannata
|KO (wheel kick)
|UFC 206
|
|align=center|1
|align=center|1:40
|Toronto, Ontario, Canada
| 
|-
|Win
|align=center|14–5
|Mehdi Baghdad
|Decision (split)
|UFC Fight Night: dos Anjos vs. Alvarez
|
|align=center|3
|align=center|5:00
|Las Vegas, Nevada, United States
|
|-
|Loss
|align=center|13–5
|Yancy Medeiros
|Decision (split)
|UFC 194
|
|align=center|3
|align=center|5:00
|Las Vegas, Nevada, United States
|    
|-
|Loss
|align=center|13–4
|Donald Cerrone
|TKO (head kick)
|UFC 187
|
|align=center|2
|align=center|4:44
|Las Vegas, Nevada, United States
|
|-
|Win
|align=center| 13–3
|Shane Campbell
|TKO (punches)
|UFC 186
|
|align=center|1
|align=center|4:53
|Montreal, Quebec, Canada
|
|-
|Loss
|align=center|12–3
|Alan Patrick
|Decision (unanimous)
|UFC 169
|
|align=center|3
|align=center|5:00
|Newark, New Jersey, United States
|
|-
|Win
|align=center|12–2
|Renée Forte
|KO (punches)
|UFC 165
|
|align=center|1
|align=center|2:01
|Toronto, Ontario, Canada
|
|-
|Win
|align=center|11–2
|Daron Cruickshank
|Decision (unanimous)
|UFC 158
|
|align=center|3
|align=center|5:00
|Montreal, Quebec, Canada
|
|-
|Win
|align=center|10–2
|Sam Stout
|Decision (unanimous)
|UFC 154
|
|align=center|3
|align=center|5:00
|Montreal, Quebec, Canada
|
|-
|Loss
|align=center|9–2
|Anthony Njokuani
|Decision (unanimous)
|UFC 145
|
|align=center|3
|align=center|5:00
|Atlanta, Georgia, United States
|
|-
|Loss
|align=center|9–1
|Dennis Hallman
|Submission (rear-naked choke)
|UFC 140
|
|align=center|1
|align=center|2:58
|Toronto, Ontario, Canada
|
|-
|Win
|align=center| 9–0
|Kyle Watson
|KO (spinning back fist)
|UFC 129
|
|align=center|3
|align=center|1:27
|Toronto, Ontario, Canada
| 
|-
|Win
|align=center|8–0
|Pat Audinwood
|Decision (unanimous)
|UFC 124
|
|align=center|3
|align=center|5:00
|Montreal, Quebec, Canada
| 
|-
|Win
|align=center|7–0
|Bendy Casimir
|Decision (unanimous)
|Mixed Fight League 3
|
|align=center|3
|align=center|5:00
|Montreal, Quebec, Canada
|
|-
|Win
|align=center|6–0
|Lindsey Hawkes
|TKO (punches)
|Canadian Fighting Championship 4
|
|align=center|2
|align=center|4:59
|Winnipeg, Manitoba, Canada
| 
|-
|Win
|align=center|5–0
|Brandon McArthur
|TKO (doctor stoppage)
|Ringside MMA: Rivalry
|
|align=center|1
|align=center|5:00
|Drummondville, Quebec, Canada
| 
|-
|Win
|align=center|4–0
|Iraj Hadin
|TKO (punches)
|Ringside MMA: Rage Fighting
|
|align=center| 2
|align=center| 4:48
|Montreal, Quebec, Canada
| 
|-
|Win
|align=center| 3–0
|Amir Uddin
|TKO (punches)
|XMMA 7: Inferno
|
|align=center|2
|align=center|3:06
|Montreal, Quebec, Canada
| 
|-
|Win
|align=center|2–0
|Dan Dechaine
|TKO (punches)
|XMMA 6: House of Pain
|
|align=center|1
|align=center|1:48
|Montreal, Quebec, Canada
| 
|-
|Win
|align=center|1–0
|Todd Westcott
|TKO (punches)
|XMMA 5: It's Crow Time
|
|align=center|1
|align=center|3:06
|Montreal, Quebec, Canada
|

See also
 List of current UFC fighters
 List of male mixed martial artists
 List of Canadian UFC fighters

References

External links
Official UFC Profile

 The Official Home Page of John 'the Bull' Makdessi

1985 births
Canadian male karateka
Canadian male kickboxers
Canadian male mixed martial artists
Lightweight mixed martial artists
Canadian people of Lebanese descent
Canadian male taekwondo practitioners
Mixed martial artists utilizing Shotokan
Mixed martial artists utilizing taekwondo
Living people
Sportspeople from Halifax, Nova Scotia
Ultimate Fighting Championship male fighters
Sportspeople of Lebanese descent